Recea may refer to the following places:

Romania
 Recea, Argeș, a commune in Argeș County
 Recea, Brașov, a commune in Brașov County
 Recea, Maramureș, a commune in Maramureș County
 Recea, a village in Căteasca Commune, Argeș County
 Recea, a village in Horgești Commune, Bacău County
 Recea, a village in Bisoca Commune, Buzău County
 Recea, a village in Tulgheș Commune, Harghita County
 Recea, a village in Țibănești Commune, Iași County
 Recea, a village in Punghina Commune, Mehedinți County
 Recea, a village attached to Ungheni town, Mureș County
 Recea, a village in Ion Creangă Commune, Neamț County
 Recea, a village in Valea Mare Commune, Olt County
 Recea, a village in Vârșolț Commune, Sălaj County
 Recea, a village in Iana Commune, Vaslui County
 Recea, a tributary of the Moara in Bacău County
 Recea (Cerna), a tributary of the Cerna in Vâlcea County
 Recea (Miletin), a tributary of the Miletin in Botoșani and Iași Counties

Moldova
Recea, Rîșcani, a commune in Rîșcani district
Recea, Strășeni, a commune in Strășeni district